Ramgarhia Misl was a sovereign state (misl) in the Sikh confederacy of Punjab region in present-day India and Pakistan. The misl's name is derived from Quila Ramgarh, a place near Amritsar which was fortified and redesigned by Ramgarhia Misl chief Jassa Singh Ramgarhia. The Ramgarhia misl was one of the 12 major Sikh misls, and held land near to Amritsar.

History 

As Quila Ramgarh was fortified to defend the Golden Temple from invaders, people of this misl derived its name Ramgarhia, which literally means Custodians of the Castle of God. Quila Ramgarh and Ramgarhia Bunga are symbol of the Ramgarhia Sikh community's identity, their historic sacrifices and contribution to defending the Golden Temple over the centuries.

Sikhs under the leadership of Jassa Singh Ramgarhia attacked Delhi and briefly held its control. They seized the granite slab of Takht-e-Taus from the Red Fort on which, according to the oral tradition, all the Mughal emperors were crowned in Delhi and brought it to Amritsar as a symbol of their victory. This green slab was placed in Ramgarhia Bunga at Amritsar, where it still lies.

The headquarters of Ramgarhia misl (Quila Ramgarh) has already lost its very existence and its location is adjacent to Gurudwara Sri Ramsar Sahib and Guru Ramdas Khalsa Senior Secondary School on Ramsar Road, Amritsar.

Photo gallery

See also
 Ramgarhia Bunga
 Golden Temple

References 

Misls
Ramgarhia people
Princely states of Punjab
Princely states of India
Amritsar
History of Punjab
History of Punjab, India
Sikh Empire